Nisrine Dinar (born 14 January 1988) is a Moroccan track and field athlete who specialises in the pole vault.

Dinar was the gold medalist at the 2010 African Championships in Athletics. She is a three-time runner-up at that competition. Similarly she was winner at the 2011 Pan Arab Games, having been runner-up in 2004 and 2007, and took two gold and three silver medals at the Arab Athletics Championships. In regional competitions, Dinar has often finished behind Tunisians Syrine Balti and Leila Ben Youssef.

She has represented Africa twice at the IAAF Continental Cup. She competed in pole vaulting from a young age, winning the 2003 African Junior Athletics Championships at age fifteen and the 2004 Arab Youth Athletics Championships at age sixteen. She won the first ever Moroccan national title in women's pole vault in 2003.

International competitions

See also
 List of champions of the African Championships in Athletics

References

External links
 

Living people
1988 births
Moroccan female pole vaulters
Athletes (track and field) at the 2005 Mediterranean Games
Mediterranean Games competitors for Morocco
Islamic Solidarity Games competitors for Morocco